The men's 4x400m T53-54 event at the 2008 Summer Paralympics took place at the  Beijing National Stadium on 14 September. There were two heats; the teams with the four fastest times (Q) advanced to the final.
The event was won by the team representing .

Results

Heats
Competed from 12:39.

Heat 1

Heat 2

Final
Competed at 18:29.

 
Q = qualified for final. WR = World Record. DQ = Disqualified (passing of the baton outside the take-over zone).

References
Official Beijing 2008 Paralympics Results: Heat 1
Official Beijing 2008 Paralympics Results: Heat 2
Official Beijing 2008 Paralympics Results: Final

Athletics at the 2008 Summer Paralympics